Lehavot, a Hebrew word meaning flames, may refer to the following places in Israel:

Lehavot HaBashan
Lehavot Haviva